Icelink is a proposed electricity interconnector between Iceland and the United Kingdom via Great Britain. At , the 8001,200MW high-voltage direct current (HVDC) link would be the longest sub-sea power interconnector in the world.

The project partners for the main proposal are National Grid plc in the UK, Landsvirkjun, the state-owned generator in Iceland, and Landsnet, the Icelandic Transmission System Operator (TSO). An alternative proposal by Edi Truell's company Disruptive Capital Finance goes by the name "Atlantic SuperConnection", but it requires UK government financing.

According to Landsvirkjun, it will take about five years to complete feasibility and other work, and if a decision is made to go ahead, construction and installation would take a further five to six years.

Status 
In 2017, the main proposal for the project was still at the feasibility stage, and, no further progress had been reported. As of 2019, the "Atlantic SuperConnection" proposal had still not obtained the required financial support from the UK government.

The link is highly controversial in Icelandic politics, with a fear of environmental effects associated with increasing Iceland's power supply to meet Icelink's demand, as well as concerns over increased domestic energy prices in Iceland. For the project to move forward, the Icelandic parliament needs to accept the construction, which as of 2022 is not likely.

Ireland variant 
At the 2019 UK General Election 2019, the Democratic Unionist Party included in their manifesto a proposal for Icelink to make landfall in Northern Ireland.

See also
 Electricity sector in Iceland
 Electricity sector in the United Kingdom
 Electricity sector in Ireland
 NorthConnect
 North Sea Link
 European super grid

References

External links
 Overview of IceLink, on the Landsvirkjun website

Electrical interconnectors to and from Great Britain
Proposed electric power transmission systems
Proposed electric power infrastructure in the United Kingdom
Electric power infrastructure in Iceland
Proposed infrastructure